Clara Khoury (born 29 December 1976) is an Israeli Arab actress. She works in film, television and theater.

Biography 
Clara Khoury was born in Haifa, Israel  . She is the daughter of the award-winning actor Makram Khoury. Her family is Greek Orthodox. She studied cinema at the Open University in Tel Aviv and drama at the Beit Zvi acting school. She is married to Sean Foley, an American with Irish and Egyptian roots.

Acting career
Khoury has worked in a variety of roles on stage including the lead in Antigone by Jean Anouih, The Glass Menagerie by Tennessee Williams and Salome by Oscar Wilde, in Arabic as well as in Hebrew and English. Her television work includes the series Parashat Hashavua, written by Ari Folman, and Arab Labor written by Sayed Kashua. She made her big screen debut in 2002 in Rana’s Wedding  by Hany Abu-Assad (director of the Oscar-nominated Paradise Now) which premiered at the Semaine Internationale de la Critique at the Cannes Film Festival.

In 2005 she gained international recognition for her role in The Syrian Bride, portraying a young Druze woman who risks losing her family by entering an arranged marriage with a Syrian national. Directed by Eran Riklis (Lemon Tree) the film won the Audience Prize at the Locarno Film Festival.

Khoury starred in Lipstikka, a British / Israeli psychological drama by Jonathan Sagall, in competition at the Berlinale 2011. At the Al-Midan Arabic Theater in Haifa she starred in Juliano Mer-Khamis's adaptation of Roman Polanski's 1994 movie Death and The Maiden after the play by Chilean playwright Ariel Dorfman.

Film
The Inheritance - (2012) Hiam Abbass
Lipstikka - (2011) by Jonathan Sagall
Dusty Road - (2009) Rukaya Sabbah
Body of Lies - (2008) Ridley Scott
Liebesleben - (2007) Maria Schrader
Forgiveness - (2006) Udi Aloni
The Syrian Bride - (2004) Eran Riklis
Rana's Wedding - (2002) Hany Abu-Assad

Theater 
Death and the Maiden—Paulina - (2010) Juliano Mer-Khamis
Hebron, Khalil / Rania -- (2007) Oded Kotler
Period of Adjustment—Isabel - (2006) Dedi Baron
Cruel and Tender—Laela - (2005) Artur kogan
Salome—Salome - (2005) Ofira Henig
The Glass Menagerie—Loura - (2004) Muneer Bakri
Gilgamesh, He is not Dead—Houmbaba - (2003) Francois Abuo-Salem
Anigone—Antigone - (2002) Gdalya Besser
Tiger at the Gate—Andromaque - (2002) Ido Ricklin

Television 
Parashat Ha-Shavua - created by Anat Asulin, Rani Blair
Kavanot Tovot - director Uri Barbash
Arab Labor - written by Sayed Kashua
Maktub - director Avi Mussel
Papadizi - director Ori Sivan
The Police Man - director Ram Levi
Homeland - created by Gideon Raff, Howard Gordon, and Alex Gansa
Baghdad Central - written by Stephen Butchard

Awards and recognition
Khoury won the Israeli Academy of Film and Television prize for best actress as Bushra in the television sitcom Arab Labor. She won the Best Actress Award for her role as Rana at the Marrakech International Film Festival.

See also
Theater of Israel
Cinema of Israel
Television of Israel

References

External links 
 Rana's Wedding Official Site
 Syrian Bride Official Site
 Forgiveness Official Site
 Other Israel Film Festival 2010
 
 Maariv 21/1/2009
 Yahoo Movies

Israeli film actresses
Israeli stage actresses
Israeli television actresses
1976 births
Living people
Beit Zvi School for the Performing Arts alumni
People from Haifa
20th-century Israeli actresses
21st-century Israeli actresses
Israeli Arab Christians